Arena Joondalup, known as HBF Arena under a commercial naming rights arrangement, is a multi-purpose sports complex in Joondalup, Western Australia, located on 35 ha of parkland approximately 25 km north of Perth. It was officially opened in 1994. An $11 million indoor aquatic centre, including a 50 m 10-lane competition pool, was completed in 2000.

The capacity of the outdoor sports ground, known as Pentanet Stadium, is 16,000 people. Along with aquatic and swimming facilities, the stadium holds seven indoor basketball courts, as well as outdoor netball, field hockey, tennis, and rugby facilities. It is the largest athletic complex of its kind in Western Australia.

History
As the home stadium of the West Perth Football Club since 1994, HBF Arena is most notably an Australian rules football venue. It became the home of Perth RedStar FC (then known as Joondalup City SC) from 1995. The Joondalup Lakers Hockey Club and the Joondalup Giants (then Joondalup & Districts Rugby League Club) moved to the Arena in 2008. Joondalup Brothers R.U.F.C., the largest junior rugby club in Western Australia, moved to the complex in 2011. HBF Arena was also one of the home grounds for the Perth Spirit team in the National Rugby Championship in 2014. In 2018, the Joondalup Wolves moved into HBF Arena after playing out of Joondalup Basketball Stadium for more than three decades.

HBF Arena was awarded the 'Facility Management Award' at the biannual Sport and Recreation Industry Awards in November 2001. From 1999 to 2012, HBF Arena was host to the Rock-It musical festival, which was one of the major rock concerts held regularly in Perth, with attendances of up to 25,000 people.

References

External links

HBF Arena official website

Basketball in Western Australia
Basketball venues in Australia
West Australian Football League grounds
Sports venues in Perth, Western Australia
Multi-purpose stadiums in Australia
Joondalup
West Perth Football Club
Rugby league stadiums in Australia
Rugby union stadiums in Australia
Netball venues in Western Australia